Below is a list of the stately homes, historic houses, castles, abbeys, museums, estates, coastline and open country in the care of the National Trust in Wales, grouped into the unitary authority areas. Many areas of land owned by the trust, both open-access and closed to the public, are not listed here. This is a list of the more notable sites, generally defined as those having either an entry in the National Trust handbook, or a page on their website. There are many other areas of moorland and open country, agricultural holdings and coastline belonging to the National Trust, that are not listed here.

Anglesey

Carmarthenshire

Ceredigion

Conwy

Gwynedd

Monmouthshire

Neath Port Talbot

Newport

Pembrokeshire

Powys

Swansea

Vale of Glamorgan

Wrexham

See also
List of Cadw properties
List of National Trust properties in England
List of National Trust properties in Northern Ireland
List of National Trust for Scotland properties

References

External links
The National Trust
Royal Commission on the Ancient and Historical Monuments of Wales in English and Welsh

Buildings and structures in Wales
 
Wales geography-related lists
Tourist attractions in Wales